The Florence Range is a small mountain range in northwestern British Columbia, Canada, located at the southern end of Taku Arm and west of Nelson Lake. It has an area of 153 km2 and is a subrange of the Boundary Ranges which in turn form part of the Coast Mountains.

See also
List of mountain ranges

References

Boundary Ranges
Mountain ranges of British Columbia